Rommel Adducul (born April 21, 1976) is a Filipino former professional basketball player who currently serves as an assistant coach for the Adamson Soaring Falcons of the UAAP.

Career
In college, Adducul, a three-time Most Valuable Player, led the San Sebastian Stags to five consecutive NCAA basketball championships from 1993 to 1997. He won the NCAA Seniors Most valuable Player (MVP) back-to-back from 1996 and 1997.

At the same time, he was a star in the Philippine Basketball League playing for the defunct Chowking Food Masters, his UAAP counterpart at that time and later Arch-rival was Danny Ildefonso.

In 1998, Adducul joined the Philippines' second professional league, the now defunct Metropolitan Basketball Association. In 1999, he led the Manila Metrostars to a championship together with American Alex Compton, and was awarded with the Play-off MVP and the Finals MVP. In 2000, Adducul was named MBA Most Valuable Player. In 2001, the Metrostars merged with the Batangas Blades and the coalition team won that year's championship. Unfortunately, the league did not last long and Adducul ended his career in the MBA with the Pangasinan Waves in 2002.

Adducul is a many-time member of the Philippine national basketball team. In 1994,he played for the Philippines at the 19-and-under FIBA Asia Championship. Then, he led the country to four consecutive Southeast Asia Basketball Association championships (1998–2001). He also led the national team to three consecutive South East Asian Games gold medals (1997, 1999, 2001). Adducul is a three-time member of the FIBA Asia All-Star Selection (1997, 1998, 2000) and in 2000, he led the All-Star team against the Philippine Basketball Association All-Stars.

At the same year, he returned briefly in the Philippine Basketball League and won that year's MVP award.

In 2003, he was drafted 2nd overall by the Barangay Ginebra Kings in the Philippine Basketball Association. He won two consecutive championships with the Kings in the 2004 and 2005 PBA seasons.

In October 2006, he was traded to the San Miguel Beermen in a three-way trade involving the Barangay Ginebra Kings and the Red Bull Barako.

In May 2007, he was traded to the Red Bull Barako for Enrico Villanueva.

After two days of trading him to the Red Bull Barako, Romel was shipped to the Purefoods Tender Juicy Giants for Don Camaso.

Personal life
Adducul was diagnosed with nasopharynx cancer. This condition prevented him from playing in the 2008 PBA Fiesta Conference to undergo chemotherapy, but has since returned. On May 3 Startalk, Romel said in an interview: "Right now, I'm doing fine because I see the improvement [from the chemo], the mass is shrinking; The radiation, 35 sessions, five times a week. The chemo is 6 cycles. I have my third cycle on Thursday, and after two more weeks I'll be finished with my last cycle which is three sessions. One week in the hospital...it's really hard but I have to do it."

Awards and achievements

Collegiate achievements

1994 NCAA Basketball Champions
1995 NCAA Basketball Champions
1996 NCAA Basketball Champions
1997 NCAA Basketball Champions
NCAA Basketball Most Valuable Player (two times)
1994–1997  NCAA Basketball  Mythical 5

PBL achievements

1997 PBL Makati Mayor's Cup Most Valuable Player
2002 PBL Challenge Cup Most Valuable Player
2002 PBL Challenge Finals Most Valuable Player
Philippine Basketball League Top 20 Greatest Players of all time (2003)

MBA achievements

1999 MBA Champions
2001 MBA Champions
1998 MBA Defensive Player of the Year
1999 MBA Defensive Player of the Year
1999 MBA Play-off Most Valuable Player
1999 MBA Finals Most Valuable Player
2000 MBA Most Valuable Player
2001 MBA Finals Most Valuable Player
2000 MBA Intra-Con Challenge finalists
1998–2002 MBA Star Player Of The Year

PBA achievements

2004 PBA Gran Matador Fiesta Conference Champions
2005 PBA Philippine Cup Champions
2006–2007 PBA Philippine Cup finalists
PBA Mythical Second Team Selection (2004–05)

International career highlights

Club and Country
1994 19-and-under FIBA Asia Championship
1997 FIBA Asia Championship, 9th place
Emirates Sportsmanship Award
1997 FIBA Asian All-Star Games
1997 FIBA Asian All-Star Sportsmanship Award
1997 South East Asian Games champions
1998 South East Asia Basketball Association champions
1998 FIBA Asian All-Star Extravaganza
1999 South East Asia Basketball Association champions
South East Asia Basketball Association Most Valuable Player (1999)
1999 Ramadan Basketball Tournament
1999 South East Asian Games champions
2000 South East Asia Club Championship champions
South East Asia Basketball Association Club Championship Most Valuable Player (2000)
2000 South East Asia Basketball Association champions
2000 FIBA Asian All-Star Extravaganza
2001 South East Asia Basketball Association champions
2001 South East Asian Games champions
2002 William Jones Cup, 5th place
2002 Shell Rimula Brunei Cup champions
Shell Rimula Brunei Cup Most Valuable Player (2002)
2002 Super Kung Sheung International Basketball Invitation Championship champions
Nike Best Shooter Award (2002)
2002 Yunnan International Tournament Honghe Cup Grand Prix
2005 FIBA Asia Champions Cup, 5th place
FIBA Asia Champions Cup Mythical Five Selection (2005)
2005 Las Vegas Global Hoops Summit
2005 William Jones Cup, 3rd place
2005 Shell Rimula Brunei Cup champions
2006 Shell Rimula Brunei Cup
2007 Bahrain-Philippines Goodwill Games champions

See also
Philippine national basketball team

References
Bocobo, Christian and Celis, Beth, Legends and Heroes of Philippine Basketball, (Philippines, 2004)

1976 births
Living people
Barangay Ginebra San Miguel players
Basketball players from Cagayan
Filipino men's basketball coaches
NorthPort Batang Pier players
Ilocano people
Magnolia Hotshots players
San Sebastian Stags basketball players
People from Tuguegarao
Philippine Basketball Association All-Stars
NorthPort Batang Pier coaches
Philippines men's national basketball team players
Filipino men's basketball players
Powerade Tigers players
Power forwards (basketball)
San Miguel Beermen players
Competitors at the 1997 Southeast Asian Games
Competitors at the 1999 Southeast Asian Games
Competitors at the 2001 Southeast Asian Games
Southeast Asian Games gold medalists for the Philippines
Southeast Asian Games competitors for the Philippines
Southeast Asian Games medalists in basketball
Barangay Ginebra San Miguel draft picks
Blackwater Bossing coaches
Adamson Soaring Falcons basketball coaches
Lyceum Pirates basketball coaches